Global Green is the American affiliate of Green Cross International, an international non-governmental organization founded by former Soviet leader Mikhail Gorbachev in 1993 to "foster a global value shift toward a sustainable and secure future."  Green Cross International operates in over 30 countries and enjoys consultative status with the United Nations Economic and Social Council, and United Nations Educational, Scientific and Cultural Organization. Global Green USA is on a 10 year mission to "lead a global response to keep us within planetary boundaries" and to "bring forth a sustainable global society founded on respect for nature, universal human rights, economic justice, and a culture of peace". GCI is an admitted observer organization with the United Nations Framework Convention on Climate Change and the Conference of the Parties to the UN Convention to Combat Desertification. It also cooperates directly with the UNEP/OCHA Environmental Emergencies Section, UN-HABITAT and other international organizations. Celebrity advocates include Leonardo DiCaprio, Yoko Ono and Pat Mitchell, who serves as an Honorary Board Member.

History 
In October 1987, five years before the first Earth Summit in Rio de Janeiro, Mikhail Gorbachev addressed a gathering in the Arctic city of Murmansk, and for the first time linked the concepts of environmental protection, nuclear disarmament, broader security concerns and development.

On 19 January 1990, in Moscow during an address to the Global Forum on Environment and Development for Survival, Mikhail Gorbachev suggested creating an “international Green Cross that offers its assistance to States in ecological trouble.” In other words, the world needed a body that would apply the medical emergency response model of the International Committee of the Red Cross to ecological issues, and expedite solutions to environmental problems that transcend national borders.

On 6 June 1992, six months after leaving office, the Rio Earth Summit civil society delegates appealed to Mikhail Gorbachev to create and launch Green Cross International. At the same time, Swiss National Council parliamentarian Roland Wiederkehr, founded a “World Green Cross” with the same objective. The organizations merged in 1993 to form Green Cross International.

Green Cross International (GCI) was formally launched in Kyoto, Japan, on April 18, 1993. On the invitation of Mikhail Gorbachev, many renowned figures joined and continue to serve on its board of directors and Honorary Board.

The first Green Cross National Organizations (GCNOs) formally joined GCI in The Hague, The Netherlands, in the Spring of 1994. These included Japan, The Netherlands, the Russian Federation, Switzerland, and the United States.

In 2007, Starbucks and Global Green have teamed up to launch Planet Green Game, an online game where "players can explore a virtual world and learn how everyday decisions by individuals, cities, schools and businesses can impact the climate and environment."

Today, Green Cross International is headquartered in Geneva, Switzerland with member countries in Argentina, Australia, Belarus, Bolivia, Brazil, Burkina Faso, Canada (PrepCom), Czech Republic, Denmark, Eswatini, France et Territoires, Ghana, Hungary, Taiwan (Information Office), Italy, Ivory Coast, Japan, Korea, The Netherlands, Panama, Russia, Spain, Sri Lanka, Sweden, Switzerland, Ukraine, and the United States.

Board of Directors 
Diane Meyer Simon, Founder of Global Green

Trammel S. Crow, Co-Chair of Global Green & Founder of EarthX

Michael Cain, Vice Chair of Global Green & CEO of EarthX Film

Rajiv Shukla, Vice Chair of Global Green & Independent Director of Ocunexus Therapeutics Inc.

Vered Nisim, Secretary of Global Green & Founder of Curagenics & President of Brellascope

Les McCabe, Treasurer of Board & CEO of Junior Achievement

Christiana Musk, Founder of Flourish*ink & Curator for Near Future Summit

Robbianne Mackin, Senior Vice President of Principal Gifts for The New York Academy of Sciences

Ovie Mughelli, Former Atlanta Falcons football player & Founder of The Ovie Mughelli Foundation

Sarah Meyer Simon, Co-Owner of Base Coat & Partner of The Butcher’s Daughter & Founder of The Simon Collective

Rick Fedrizzi, Founding Chair of USGBC & CEO of the International WELL Building Institute

Carlton A. Brown, Founding partner & COO of Full Spectrum NY

Asher Simon, Artist & Musician

Don Burris, Founder & Senior Partner of Burris & Schoenberg, LLP

Tony Keane, CEO of EarthX

Kai Milla-Morris, Fashion Designer & Former wife of Stevie Wonder

Emeritus Board Members 
Ted Turner

Robert S. Bucklin

Jerry Moss

Lee H. Hamilton

Edward Norton

John Paul DeJoria

Leonardo DiCaprio

Dr. Jane Goodall

Jayni Chase

Norman Lear

Pat Mitchell

Scott Seydel

Yoko Ono

Chief Oren Lyons

Robert Redford

References

Environmental organizations based in California
Environmental organizations established in 1993
Sustainability